The 2011–12 St. Louis Blues season was the 45th season of operation (44th of play) for the National Hockey League (NHL) franchise that was established on June 5, 1967.

The Blues qualified for the Stanley Cup playoffs for the first time since the 2008–09 NHL season, and the second time since the end of the lockout. They also won their first Central division title since the 1999–2000 NHL season.

Off-Season
The Blues extended contracts for all four of their coaches on May 26: Brad Shaw and Ray Bennette (assistant coaches), Corey Hirsch (goaltending consultant) and Scott Masters (video coach).

Forward David Backes is named team captain, filling a vacancy left by Eric Brewer's departure during the previous season.

Regular season

October

November
On November 3, St. Louis Cardinals' ace pitcher Chris Carpenter laced up the skates for a practice session with other Blues' players, taking shots and making passes. He played ice hockey in high school at 16 and was an all-state defenseman his last three years for Trinity High School in Manchester, New Hampshire, with scouts from the Chicago Blackhawks and Boston Bruins pursuing him for a hockey career, which he ultimately turned down to pursue a career in baseball. He loved this hockey experience with the Blues, holding season tickets, and will be at Cardinals Night on November 4.

The Blues celebrated Cardinals Night before the game on November 4. Former Cardinals manager Tony La Russa dropped the ceremonial first puck.

The Blues fired head coach Davis Payne (6–7–0 record; 12 points for 13th in Western Conference) on November 6 and replaced him with Ken Hitchcock. Hitchcock became the 24th head coach in Blues' history and agreed to a contract through to the 2012–13 season.

The Blues paid tribute before a home game on November 8, to two of their past players, Pavol Demitra (1996–2004) and Igor Korolev (1992–1994), who died in a September 7 plane crash near Yaroslavl, Russia, that carried the Lokomotiv Yaroslavl team. Both players wore uniform number 38 while with the team. The accident killed 45 players, coaches, team personnel and members of the flight crew. It is the single-largest tragedy in the history of professional hockey.

Chris Stewart was suspended for three games on November 16 as a result of his hit on Detroit Red Wings defenseman Niklas Kronwall in the previous night's game.

Left-winger David Perron was cleared for contact in practice skating on November 19. He has not played since suffering a concussion on November 4, 2010, missing the remaining 72 games last season.

Ken Hitchcock is off to the best start for a new coach for the Blues in their team history after 10 games, with a 7–1–2 (16 points out of a possible 20) record, an 80% success rate, surpassing Joel Quenneville, who started with a 70% success rate through his first 10 games.

On November 28, new goaltender Brian Elliott was named the NHL's Third Star of the Week for the week ending November 27, posting a 3–0–0 (0.98 goals against average, 0.963 save percentage and one shutout) record with wins over the Pittsburgh Penguins (3–2 in overtime), Calgary Flames (2–0) and Columbus Blue Jackets (2–1). He presently leads the League with his 1.31 GAA and .951 save percentage, and tied with his three shutouts.

December
On December 2, injured forward David Perron was activated for the December 3 game in St. Louis, his first regular season game since suffering his concussion against the San Jose Sharks on November 4, 2010. He missed 97 games.

January
Ron Caron, former Blues general manager (1983–1993, December 1996–June 1997), died at 82 in his Montreal home on January 9, the night before the Blues shut out the Montreal Canadiens at the Bell Centre, a team for which Caron was a longtime scout and assistant general manager. Caron led the Blues to a 438–405–127 record during his years, including a 47–22–11 (105 points) in 1990–91, the third-best record in Blues' history. The Blues qualified for the playoffs in each of Caron's 12 years as GM. Former Blues' Hall of Fame center Bernie Federko said he did not know a more passionate hockey man in the world.

Goaltender Brian Elliott was named to the 2012 All-Star Game in Ottawa on January 29.

February
Andy McDonald recorded an assist on the first goal of the game on February 12, his first game back after missing 51 games recovering from a concussion.

David Perron was named the Third Star of the Week after scoring six goals, an assist and posting a +5 plus-minus rating in four games in the week ending February 12. He has 24 points (10 goals and 14 assists) in 30 games.

March
The Blues climbed atop the NHL standings with a 3–1 win at home over the Anaheim Ducks on March 8, giving them an NHL-best 93 points (43–18–7). It is the latest date the Blues have been first this late in a season since March 9, 2000. They were 30th (last) in the NHL as recently as the 2005–06 season. They have an NHL-leading 46 points since January 1, and are a perfect 35–0 when scoring at least three goals in a game. They were 6–7 when Head Coach Ken Hitchcock took over on November 6.

The Blues announced they had signed 19-year-old center Jaden Schwartz, their first overall 2010 draft pick to an entry-level contract on March 12. He was immediately added to the Blues' roster.  He scored in his first NHL game on March 17 in Tampa against the Lightning. The goal proved to be the game-winner in the 3–1 win, the 13th player in Blues' history to perform the feat.  In that same game, the Blues became the first team to attain 100 points, as well as the first to clinch a playoff spot.

Alexander Steen was activated on March 25 after missing 39 games due to concussion syndrome since last playing on December 27. Kris Russell also returned to the lineup since experiencing a concussion on February 23.

The Blues set their all-time franchise record with Brian Elliott's eighth shutout of the season (in only 35 appearances) on March 25, giving the Blues 14 for the season. Additionally, Jaroslav Halak has six shutouts in 43 appearances. The duo broke the previous record of 13 set by Glenn Hall and Jacques Plante from the 1968–69 season. Elliott also tied Hall with his eighth shutout of the season, though Hall still owns the team record with 16 shutouts.

The Blues set their all-time franchise record with their 30th home win on March 27. More records were set with goalie Brian Elliott's Most Consecutive Shutout Minutes (186:33), surpassing Manny Legace's 186:15. His ninth shutout against the Nashville Predators surpassed Glenn Hall's record of eight for a season. Elliott and Halak have combined for a modern-era NHL record of 15 shutouts, extending their previous record of 14 set March 25. The team's 105 points are their second-best in their history, surpassed only by the 1999–2000 season when they earned 114 points and won their first Presidents' Trophy.

They clinched the Central Division title on March 31.

April
Brian Elliott's shutout streak ended on April 4, after 241:33. It was a new franchise record beating Manny Legace's previous record of 186:15 set from Dec. 28, 2007 to Jan. 8, 2008.

Elliott and Jaroslav Halak captured the William Jennings Trophy for the first time in leading the NHL in fewest goals allowed by a team's goaltenders with 165. Excluding 10 shootout goals allowed, the Blues allowed only 155 goals over their 82-game regular season, breaking the all-time record for fewest goals allowed in an 82-game season, which had been set at 164 by the 2003–04 New Jersey Devils. It was only the second time in franchise history that the Blues goaltenders were awarded the William Jennings Trophy, as Roman Turek and Jamie McLennan had received the honor in the 1999–2000 season. The Blues also tied the modern NHL record with the 1969–70 Chicago Blackhawks, with 15 shutouts. Combined with the 5 shutouts against the Blues, 20 of the Blues' 82 regular-season games ended in a shutout. Elliott and Halak are the first tandem goaltenders to record at least six shutouts each in the same season; Elliot had nine. He led the NHL with a 1.56 goals-against average and a .940 save percentage. His three consecutive shutouts tied the franchise record of Greg Millen in the 1988–89 season. Halak ranked fifth with a 1.97 goals-against average and a .926 save percentage. They will be honored on June 20 at the 2012 NHL Awards.

The Blues' lost only six of 41 home games, and their .793 own-ice percentage was their best in franchise history.

Playoffs

The Blues ended the 2011–12 regular season as the Western Conference's 2nd seed. They defeated the #7 seed San Jose Sharks 4–1 in the first round, winning their first playoff series since 2002. They next faced the #8 seed Los Angeles Kings in the second round and were swept out of the playoffs.

Game three of the Blues-Sharks (Monday) April 16 playoff was the highest-rated Blues' game ever broadcast on Fox Sports Midwest with an 11.0 household rating. Game three of the 2001 playoff game against the Dallas Stars was the previous high with a 9.9 household rating, followed by a 9.8 rating for game four of that series, and fourth-highest a 9.7 rating for the game one opener with the Sharks  on (Thursday) April 12, 2012.

Standings

Schedule and results

Pre-season

Regular season

Playoffs 

Key:  Win  Loss

Player statistics

Skaters
(Regular season through games of April 21, 2012)   FINAL 

Stats

Note: GP = Games played; G = Goals; A = Assists; Pts = Points; +/− = Plus/minus; PIM = Penalty minutes

* indicates not currently on the active roster. 
+ indicates on Injured Reserve. 
Stats reflect time with Blues only. 
Stats reflect time with Blues only.
Bold = leading team in category.

Goaltenders
(Updated through April 7, 2012)   FINAL 

Stats

Note: GP = Games played; TOI = Time on ice (minutes); W = Wins; L = Losses; OT = Overtime losses; GA = Goals against; GAA= Goals against average; SA= Shots against; SV= Saves; Sv% = Save percentage; SO= Shutouts

BOLD = individual leading NHL     * = Modern NHL Record

Awards and records

Awards

Milestones

Transactions 

The Blues have been involved in the following transactions during the 2011–12 season

Trades

Free agents signed

Free agents lost

Claimed via Waivers

Lost via waivers

Lost via retirement

Player signings

Draft picks
St. Louis' picks at the 2011 NHL Entry Draft in Saint Paul, Minnesota, at the Xcel Energy Center from June 24–25, 2011.

The Blues had no first-round pick in the draft, because of the trade with the Colorado Avalanche during the 2010–2011 season.

Farm teams

Peoria Rivermen
The Peoria Rivermen are the Blues American Hockey League affiliate in 2011–12.

Alaska Aces
The Alaska Aces are the Blues affiliate in the ECHL.

See also
 2011–12 NHL season
 St. Louis Blues seasons
 St. Louis (sports)

References

External links
2011–12 St. Louis Blues season at ESPN
2011–12 St. Louis Blues season at Hockey Reference

St. Louis Blues seasons
S
S
St Louis
St Louis